The 2003-04 Zurich Premiership was the 17th season of the top flight of the English domestic rugby union competitions.

Rotherham were relegated after failing to win a single match all season.

Participating teams

Table

Results

Week 1

Week 2

Week 3

Week 4

Week 5

Week 6

Week 7

Week 8

Week 9

Week 10

Week 11

Week 12

Week 13

Week 14

Week 15

Week 16

Week 17

Week 18

Week 19

Week 20

Week 21

Week 22

Week 23

Week 24

Play-offs 
As for the 2002–03 season, the first placed team automatically qualified for the final where they played the winner of the second vs third place semi-final.

Semi-final

Final

Zurich Wildcard
The Zurich Wildcard was contested by the teams placed fourth through seventh in the final table.

Semi finals

Despite winning this match, Gloucester forfeited their place in the final as English teams were awarded an additional Heineken Cup qualification place due to London Wasps winning the 2003–04 Heineken Cup. This additional place was awarded to Gloucester as the next highest placed team in the league not automatically qualified.

Final

Leading scorers
Note: Flags to the left of player names indicate national team as has been defined under World Rugby eligibility rules, or primary nationality for players who have not earned international senior caps. Players may hold one or more non-WR nationalities.

Most points 
Source:

Most tries
Source:

Total Season Attendances

References

External links
Who Will Play In The Zurich Wildcard Final 
Wildcard and Euro Qualification Explained
2003/4 Zurich Premiership Preview - The Finals

2003–04
  
England